Gumption may refer to:

 Gumption County, a mythical location invented by radio talk-show host Joe Soucheray
 Gumption: Relighting the Torch of Freedom with America's Gutsiest Troublemakers, a 2015 book by Nick Offerman
 Gumption, a 1990 album by Jamaican reggae musician Bunny Wailer
 Gumption!, a 2010 book by American writer Elise Broach
 Moxie Gumption, a character in the American daily comic strip Ink Pen

See also
 Grit, Guts and Gumption, a 2010 book by Rajesh Chakrabarti